Michael J. Dinneen is an American-New Zealand mathematician and computer scientist working as a senior lecturer at the University of Auckland, New Zealand. He is co-director of the Center for Discrete Mathematics and Theoretical Computer Science. He does research in combinatorial algorithms, distributive programming, experimental graph theory, and experimental algorithmic information theory.

Selected bibliography
 Michael J. Dinneen, Georgy Gimel'farb, and Mark C. Wilson. Introduction to Algorithms, Data Structures and Formal Languages. Pearson (Education New Zealand), 2004.  (pages 253).
 Cristian S. Calude, Michael J. Dinneen, and Chi-Kou Shu. Computing a glimpse of randomness. "Experimental Mathematics", 11(2):369-378, 2002. http://www.cs.auckland.ac.nz/~cristian/Calude361_370.pdf
 Joshua J. Arulanandham, Cristian S. Calude, and Michael J. Dinneen. A fast natural algorithm for searching. "Theoretical Computer Science", 320(1):3-13, 2004. http://authors.elsevier.com/sd/article/S0304397504001914
 Michael J. Dinneen, Bakhadyr Khoussainov, André Nies (eds.). Computation, Physics and Beyond - International Workshop on Theoretical Computer Science, WTCS 2012, Dedicated to Cristian S. Calude on the Occasion of His 60th Birthday, Auckland, New Zealand, February 21-24, 2012, Revised Selected and Invited Papers. Lecture Notes in Computer Science 7160, Springer 2012. https://www.springer.com/gp/book/9783642276538

External links
 Michael J. Dinneen Home Page
 List of publications of Michael J. Dinneen
 CDMTCS at the University of Auckland
 List of publications of Michael J. Dinneen at DBLP

20th-century American mathematicians
21st-century American mathematicians
Living people
New Zealand mathematicians
Academic staff of the University of Auckland
Year of birth missing (living people)